Branchiibius cervicis is a bacterium from the genus of Branchiibius which has been isolated from the skin of patients with atopic dermatitis from Saitama in Japan.

References

 

Micrococcales
Bacteria described in 2013